The 1996 French Open was a tennis tournament that took place on the outdoor clay courts at the Stade Roland Garros in Paris, France. The tournament was held from 27 May until 9 June. It was the 100th staging of the French Open, and the second Grand Slam tennis event of 1996.

Seniors

Men's singles 

 Yevgeny Kafelnikov defeated  Michael Stich, 7–6(7–4), 7–5, 7–6(7–4)
It was Kafelnikov's 3rd title of the year, and his 10th overall. It was his 1st career Grand Slam title.

Women's singles 

 Steffi Graf defeated  Arantxa Sánchez Vicario, 6–3, 6–7(4–7), 10–8
It was Graf's 4th title of the year, and her 99th overall. It was her 19th career Grand Slam title, and her 5th French Open title.

Men's doubles 

 Yevgeny Kafelnikov /  Daniel Vacek defeated  Guy Forget /  Jakob Hlasek, 6–2, 6–3

Women's doubles 

 Lindsay Davenport /  Mary Joe Fernández defeated  Gigi Fernández /  Natasha Zvereva, 6–2, 6–1

Mixed doubles 

 Patricia Tarabini /  Javier Frana defeated  Nicole Arendt /  Luke Jensen, 6–2, 6–2

Juniors

Boys' singles 
 Alberto Martín (ESP) defeated  Björn Rehnquist (SWE), 6–3, 7–6

Girls' singles 
 Amélie Mauresmo (FRA) defeated  Meghann Shaughnessy (USA), 6–0, 6–4

Boys' doubles 
 Sébastien Grosjean /  Olivier Mutis (FRA) defeated  Jan-Ralph Brandt /  Daniel Elsner (GER), 6–2, 6–3

Girls' doubles 
 Alice Canepa /  Giulia Casoni (ITA) defeated  Anna Kournikova (RUS) /  Ludmila Varmužová (CZE), 6–2, 5–7, 7–5

References

External links
 French Open official website

 
1996 in French tennis
1996 in Paris